MAG Aerospace is an American-owned military contractor based in Fairfax, Virginia, founded by Joe Fluet in 2009. It specializes in intelligence, surveillance and reconnaissance services operations, training and technical services and clocked 98,000 flight hours on five continents in 2017. It is active in Afghanistan. MAG Aerospace grew by 70% to 80% annually from 2015 to 2018 to more than $300 million in annual revenue. Having secured private equity backing in 2018 from New Mountain Capital, a New York-based firm with $20 billion in assets, MAG Aerospace acquired four companies over the two-year span of 2017 and 2018.

In 2018, it acquired the southern Maryland defense contractor Ausley Associates, as well as Avenge Inc. and North American Surveillance Systems Inc. MAG employs about 1,300 personnel and records over $400 million in annual sales. That same year, former Army Chief of Staff General Peter Schoomaker joined MAG Aerospace's board of directors.

History 
In 2017, MAG Aerospace had the #779 spot on the Inc. 5000.

In 2018, a civilian contractor was fired from MAG Aerospace for displaying a "Kekistan" flag patch on his helmet.

As of May 2019, MAG Aerospace continues to help the U.S. military fight the Taliban in Afghanistan as part of Task Force ODIN under the Army’s Medium Altitude Reconnaissance and Surveillance System (MARSS) program.

In 2021, the United Nations peacekeeping mission in Mali contracted US-based MAG Aerospace to provide fixed wing intelligence, surveillance and reconnaissance aircraft. They will use Cessna 208 aircraft to meet the UN requirements.

See also 
 List of private military contractors
 Private military company

References

External links 
 MAG Aerospace website

2009 establishments in Virginia
Private military contractors
American companies established in 2009